The 2018 Croatia Open Umag  (also known as the Plava Laguna Croatia Open Umag for sponsorship reasons) was a men's tennis tournament played on outdoor clay courts. It was the 29th edition of the Croatia Open, and part of the ATP World Tour 250 Series of the 2018 ATP World Tour. It took place at the International Tennis Center in Umag, Croatia, from 15 July through 22 July 2018.

ATP singles main draw entrants

Seeds 

 1 Rankings are as of July 2, 2018

Other entrants 
The following players received wildcards into the singles main draw:
  Félix Auger-Aliassime
  Nino Serdarušić
  Franko Škugor

The following players received entry from the qualifying draw:
  Rogério Dutra Silva
  Martin Kližan
  Stefano Travaglia
  Marco Trungelliti

The following player received entry as a lucky loser:
  Andrej Martin

Withdrawals 
Before the tournament
  Kyle Edmund → replaced by  Andrej Martin
  Guillermo García López → replaced by  Laslo Đere
  Filip Krajinović → replaced by  Taro Daniel
  Andreas Seppi → replaced by  Guido Pella

ATP doubles main draw entrants

Seeds 

 Rankings are as of July 2, 2018

Other entrants 
The following pairs received wildcards into the doubles main draw:
  Marin Draganja /  Tomislav Draganja
  Ivan Sabanov /  Matej Sabanov

The following pair received entry as alternates:
  Nicolás Jarry /  Roberto Quiroz

Withdrawals 
Before the tournament
  Ariel Behar

Champions

Men's singles 

  Marco Cecchinato def.  Guido Pella, 6–2, 7–6(7–4)

Men's doubles 

 Robin Haase /  Matwé Middelkoop def.  Roman Jebavý /  Jiří Veselý, 6–4, 6–4

References

External links 
 Official website

Croatia Open Umag
2018
2018 in Croatian tennis
Croatia Open Umag